Bowen Park may refer to:
Bowen Park, Brisbane, a historic area in Bowen Hills, Queensland, Australia
Bowen Park (Waukegan), a historic park in Waukegan, Illinois, United States

See also
 Bowne Park, Queens, New York, United States